The Architects of History is a Big Finish Productions audio drama based on the long-running British science fiction television series Doctor Who. It contains a four-part story.
The story was broadcast on BBC Radio 4 Extra in 4 episodes on 30 May, 31 May, 1 June and 4 June 2012.

Plot
In 2044, the Selachians attack Earth’s Moonbase. And the Galactic Reich is threatened.

Cast
The Doctor — Sylvester McCoy
Klein — Tracey Childs
Rachel Cooper — Lenora Crichlow
Sam Kirke — Ian Hayles
Major Richter — Jamie Parker
Generalleutnant Tendexter — Lloyd McGuire
Selachian Leader — Chris Porter
Feldwebel/Computer Voice — Rachel Laurence
Pilot/Selachian — David Dobson

References

External links
The Architects of History

2010 audio plays
Seventh Doctor audio plays
Radio plays based on Doctor Who
2012 radio dramas
Works by Steve Lyons
Fiction set in 2044
Fiction set on the Moon